Old Mother Riley Detective is a 1943 British comedy film directed by Lance Comfort and starring Arthur Lucan, Kitty McShane and Hal Gordon. It was part of the long running Old Mother Riley series. Old Mother Riley investigates the disappearance of food during the war, a serious crime because of rationing.

Plot
The film opens with a night watchman being bludgeoned, as a safe is cracked open in the offices of the District Food Controller. A list of wartime foods to be rationed is stolen, and the police fear gangsters are planning to sell the foods on the black market. As the office charwoman, Old Mother Riley's fingerprints are all over the safe, and she becomes the police's number one suspect. To prove her innocence, Mother Riley turns detective, adopting various methods and disguises to track down the villains.

Cast
 Arthur Lucan as Mrs. Riley
 Kitty McShane as Kitty Riley
 Ivan Brandt as Inspector Victor Cole
 Owen Reynolds as Kenworthy
 George Street as Inspector Moresby
 Johnnie Schofield as P.C. Jimmy Green
 Hal Gordon as Bill
 Valentine Dunn as Elsie
 H. F. Maltby as H. G. Popplethwaite
 Peggy Cummins as Lily
 Alfredo Campoli as Solo Violinist

Critical reception
TV Guide wrote of the film, "a lifeless effort...The gangster premise is merely an excuse for Lucan to try out some humorous bits (in drag, of course), but the picture is too padded to hold much interest." Kinematograph Weekly noted, "one of Arthur Lucan's and the series' best efforts."

References

External links

1943 films
1943 comedy films
British comedy films
Films directed by Lance Comfort
British black-and-white films
Films shot at British National Studios
1940s English-language films
1940s British films